Eudryoctenes is a genus of longhorn beetles of the subfamily Lamiinae, containing the following species:

 Eudryoctenes africanus (Jordan, 1903)
 Eudryoctenes spinipennis Breuning, 1978

References

Polyrhaphidini